Harry Fisher may refer to:

 Harry Fisher (baseball) (1926–1981), Canadian baseball player
 Harry Fisher (cricketer) (1899–1982), Australia cricketer
 Harry A. Fisher (1882–1967), American college basketball coach
 Harry L. Fisher (1885–1961), American chemist
 Bud Fisher (1885–1954), American cartoonist
 Franklin J. Phillips (1874–1900), United States Marine Corps soldier, also known as Harry Fisher
 Harry Fisher (1868–1923), British actor - see The Master Mind 
 Harry Fisher, contestant on The Voice UK (series 5)
 Harry Fisher, a character of the BBC television series Waterloo Road - see List of Waterloo Road characters

See also
 Harold Fisher (disambiguation)
 Henry Fisher (disambiguation)
 Harrison Fisher (1877–1934), American illustrator
 Harry Otto Fischer (1910–1986), American science fiction fan